Woman at Point Zero is a novel by Nawal El Saadawi written in 1975 and published in Arabic in 1977. The novel is based on Saadawi's meeting with a female prisoner in Qanatir Prison and is the first-person account of Firdaus, a murderess who has agreed to tell her life story before her execution. The novel explores the themes of women and their place within a patriarchal society.

Background
At the end of 1972 Saadawi was removed from her position as the Director of Health Education and the Editor-in-Chief of Health magazine after the publication of Women and Sex.  She began research on neurosis in Egyptian women, during which she met a doctor at Qanatir Prison who talked to her about the inmates, including a female prisoner who had killed a man and had been sentenced to hanging.  Saadawi was interested in meeting the woman and visiting the prison, and her colleague arranged for her to conduct her research at Qanatir Prison in the autumn of 1974.  Saadawi visited many women in the cell block and in the mental clinic and was able to conduct twenty-one in-depth case studies for her 1976 publication, Women and Neurosis in Egypt, but Firdaus remained "a woman apart." Firdaus was executed in 1974, but she left a lasting impact on Saadawi, who said she could not rest until she had written about Firdaus' story and finished the novel in one week.  Saadawi describes Firdaus as a martyr and says she admires her because, "Few people are ready to face death for a principle."  Later, when Saadawi was imprisoned in Qanatir in 1981 for political offenses, she reflected that she would find herself looking for Firdaus among the prison population, unable to believe that the woman who had inspired her so much was truly dead.

Publication history
Initially, Egyptian publishers rejected the book and the first edition was published by Dar al-Adab in Beirut in 1977 (with a second edition in 1979). Woman at Point Zero has subsequently been published in twenty-two languages. The English-language translation was originally published in 1983 by Zed Books in London and Room 400 in New York.

Plot summary 

The novel opens with a psychiatrist who is researching inmates at a women's prison. The prison doctor speaks of a woman, Firdaus, who is unlike any of the murderers in the prison: she rarely eats or sleeps, she never talks, she never accepts visitors. She feels certain the woman is incapable of murder, but she has refused to sign any appeals on her behalf. The psychiatrist makes several attempts to speak with her, but Firdaus declines. The rejections cause the psychiatrist to have a crisis of self-confidence. She becomes consumed with the idea that Firdaus is better than herself, and possibly better than even the president, whom she has refused to send an appeal to. As the psychiatrist is leaving the warder comes to her with an urgent message: Firdaus wants to speak to her. Upon meeting, Firdaus promptly tells her to close the window, sit down, and listen. She explains that she is going to be executed that evening and she wants to tell her life story.

Firdaus describes a poor childhood in a farming community.  She recalls that she was confused by the disparity between her father's actions, such as beating her mother, and his dedication to the Islamic faith. Those days were relatively happy days, as she was sent out to the fields to work and tend the goats. She enjoys the friendship of a boy named Mohammadain, with whom she plays "bride and bridegroom", and describes her first encounters with clitoral stimulation. One day Firdaus's mother sends for a woman with a knife, who mutilates her genitals. From that point on Firdaus is assigned work in the home. Firdaus' uncle begins to take a sexual interest in her and she describes her new lack of clitoral sensitivity, noting, "He was doing to me what Mohammadain had done to me before. In fact, he was doing even more, but I no longer felt the strong sensation of pleasure that radiated from an unknown and yet familiar part of my body. ... It was as if I could not longer recall the exact spot from which it used to arise, or as though a part of me, of my being, was gone and would never return."

After the death of her parents, Firdaus is taken in by her uncle, who sends her to primary school, which she loves. She maintains a close relationship with her uncle, who continues to take an interest in her sexually. After Firdaus receives her primary school certificate a distance grows between uncle and niece, and her uncle marries and withdraws all affection and attention. Tensions between Firdaus and her aunt-in-law build until Firdaus is placed in boarding school, where Firdaus falls in love with a female teacher named Miss Iqbal, whom she feels a mutual connection to, but Iqbal keeps her at an arm's length and never allows her to get close.

Upon graduation, Firdaus' aunt convinces her uncle to arrange her marriage with Sheikh Mahmoud, a "virtuous man" who needs an obedient wife. Firdaus considers running away but ultimately submits to the marriage. Mahmoud repulses her — he is forty years older and has a sore on his chin that oozes pus. He stays home all day, micromanaging Firdaus' every action, and begins to physically abuse her.

Firdaus runs away and wanders the streets aimlessly until she stops to rest at a coffee shop. The owner, Bayoumi, offers her tea and a place to stay until she finds a job, which she accepts. After several months, Firdaus tells him she wants to find a job and her own place to live. Bayoumi immediately becomes violent and beats her savagely. He starts locking her up during the day and allows his friends to abuse, insult, and rape her. Eventually, Firdaus is able to enlist the aid of a female neighbor, who calls a carpenter to open the door, allowing her to escape.

While on the run, Firdaus meets the madame Sharifa Salah el Dine, who takes her into her brothel as a high-class prostitute. She tells Firdaus that all men are the same and that she must be harder than life if she wants to live. In exchange for working in Sharifa's brothel Firdaus is given beautiful clothes and delicious food, but she has no pleasure in life. One evening she overhears an argument between Sharifa and her pimp, Fawzy, who wants to take Firdaus as his own. They argue, and Fawzy overpowers Sharifa and rapes her. Firdaus realizes that even Sharifa does not have true power and she runs away.

Wandering in the rainy night, Firdaus is picked up by a stranger who takes her back to his home. He sleeps with her, but he is not as disgusting as the other men she has dealt with in her profession, and after they are done he gives her a 10 pound note. This is a moment of awakening for Firdaus, and she recalls that it, "solved the enigma in one swift, sweeping moment, tore away the shroud that covered up a truth I had in fact experienced when still a child, when for the first time my father gave me a coin to hold in my hand, and be mine". Firdaus realizes that she can exert her power over men by rejecting them, and can force men to yield to her will by naming her own price; she gains self-confidence and soon becomes a wealthy and highly sought prostitute.  She employs a cook and an assistant, works whatever hours she wishes, and cultivates powerful friendships. One day, her friend Di'aa tells her she is not respectable. This insult has a jarring and immediate impact on Firdaus, who comes to realize that she can no longer work as a prostitute.

Firdaus takes a job at a local office and refuses to offer her body to the higher officials for promotions or raises. Although she believes that her new job will bring respect, she makes significantly less money than when working as a prostitute, and lives in squalid conditions. Furthermore, her office job gives her little autonomy or freedom which she values so highly. She eventually falls in love with Ibrahim, a coworker and revolutionary chairman, with whom she develops a deep emotional connection. But when Ibrahim announces his engagement to the chairman's daughter, which has clearly been engineered to help his career, Firdaus realizes he does not reciprocate her feelings and only used her for sex.

Crushed and disillusioned, Firdaus returns to prostitution, and once again amasses great wealth and becomes highly influential. Her success attracts the attention of the pimp Marzouk, who has many political connections and threatens her with police action. He repeatedly beats Firdaus and forces her to give him larger percentages of her earnings. Firdaus decides to leave and take up another job, but Marzouk blocks her way and tells her she can never leave. When he pulls a knife, Firdaus takes it and stabs him to death.

High with the sense of her new freedom, Firdaus walks the streets until she is picked up by a high-profile Arabian prince, who she refuses until he agrees to her price of 3,000 pounds. As soon as the transaction is over, she tells him that she killed a man. He does not believe her, but she scares him to the point that he is convinced. The prince has her arrested and Firdaus is sentenced to death. Firdaus says that she has been sentenced to death because they were afraid to let her live, for: "My life means their death. My death means their life. They want to live." As she is finishing her story, armed policemen come for her, and the psychiatrist sits, stunned, as Firdaus is taken to be executed, and realizes that Firdaus has more courage than her.

Literary significance and reception
Critics have praised Saadawi for exposing the subjugation of women in Middle Eastern societies, but Wen-Chin Ouyang notes that Saadawi's work and its popularity in Western countries is regarded with suspicion by Arab critics, who contend that Saadawi perpetuates negative Western stereotypes of Arab-Islamic male violence and domination and that her work has been neglected due to its literary shortcomings.

References

External links
Podcast of Nawal El Saadawi discussing Woman at Point Zero on the BBC's World Book Club.
Woman at Point Zero Literary Dialogues at www.wmich.edu 
1979 novels
Egyptian novels
Arabic-language novels
Novels about orphans
Novels set in Egypt
Novels about rape
Works about female genital mutilation
Novels about violence against women